Family Matters (Chinese: 法庭俏佳人) is a 2006 Singaporean Mandarin television drama series which was aired on Mediacorp TV Channel 8. Starring Ivy Lee and Thomas Ong, the series depicts the lives of two lawyers who specialise in divorce cases in the Family Court of Singapore, and also their romance which is fraught with troubles.

Plot summary
As a child, Zhao Shuyang (Ivy Lee) was adopted by Zheng Zhigang (Chen Shucheng) when her parents got separated and remarried. Raised by Zheng, Shuyang grew up to become a promising lawyer, specializing in divorce cases.

Having been loved by her adoptive parents and stepbrother, Zheng Weilun (Terence Cao), Shuyang yearns to marry. Her stepbrother, Weilun, tries to woo her but to no avail, because Shuyang is romantically interested in Gao Ming.

However, Shuyang is shocked when she finds out the truth about Gao Ming (Thomas Ong), her adoptive father's illegitimate son. To make matters worse, she finds herself falling for the ever-flamboyant Gao Ming. Towards the end, she contracts stomach cancer with little hope of survival.

In the last episode, Shuyang chooses Gao Ming and Wei Lun is sent to prison. Shuyang manages to keep her condition in control by undergoing treatment for a year. Gao Ming And Shuyang then get married.

Cast
Ivy Lee as Zhao Shuyang
Thomas Ong as Gao Ming
Terence Cao as Zheng Weilun
Cynthia Koh as Guan Ji'er
Chen Shucheng as Zheng Zhigang
Lin Yuyun as Li Chunling
Lin Meijiao as Gao Wei
Wang Yuqing as Xie Xhangfeng
Nick Shen as Shi Baobao
Huang Dingrong as Rain
Rebecca Lim as Luo Manshi
Tan Xin Yi as Young Shuyang
Li Jiaxun as Young Weilun

2006 Accolades

See also
List of programmes broadcast by Mediacorp Channel 8

References

External links
Family Matters (English) on Mediacorp website
Family Matters (Chinese) on Mediacorp website

Singapore Chinese dramas
Singaporean legal television series
2006 Singaporean television series debuts
2000s Singaporean television series
2000s legal television series
Channel 8 (Singapore) original programming